Montri Vaenpradab (born August 18, 1987) is a member of the Thailand men's national volleyball team.

Career 
Montri played on loan with the Thai club Air Force for the 2017 season.

Clubs 
  Chiang Rai (2010–2012)
  Cosmo - Chiang Rai (2012–2013)
  Sisaket Suandusit (2013–2014)
  Krungkao Air Force (2014–2015)
  Ratchaburi (2015–2018)
  Air Force (2017)
  Visakha (2018–2019)

Awards

Individuals
 2010–11 Thailand League "Best Blocker"

Club
 2011-12 Thailand League -  Runner-Up, with Chiang Rai
 2015 Thai-Denmark Super League -  Bronze Medal, with Krungkao Air Force
 2016–17 Thailand League -  Third, with Ratchaburi
 2018–19 Thailand League -  Third, with Visakha

Royal decoration
 2015 -  Gold Medalist (Sixth Class) of The Most Admirable Order of the Direkgunabhorn

References

1987 births
Living people
Montri Vaenpradab
Montri Vaenpradab
Volleyball players at the 2010 Asian Games
Volleyball players at the 2014 Asian Games
Montri Vaenpradab
Southeast Asian Games medalists in volleyball
Competitors at the 2009 Southeast Asian Games
Montri Vaenpradab
Montri Vaenpradab